Stygobromus elatus, commonly called elevated spring amphipod, is a phreatobite species of amphipod in family Crangonyctidae. It is endemic to Arkansas in the United States.

References

Freshwater crustaceans of North America
Crustaceans described in 1967
elatus
Endemic fauna of Arkansas